Pannecières is a commune in the Loiret department in north-central France.

Pannecieres is a small village in a rural area located 62 km south of Paris, France.

Agriculture is the main resource, while more and more "suburbanites" are moving in to become "rurbanites".

See also
 Communes of the Loiret department

References

Communes of Loiret